Japanese domestic market (JDM) refers to Japan's home market for vehicles and vehicle parts. Japanese owners contend with a strict motor vehicle inspection and grey markets.

There is a common misconception that any Japanese branded car is JDM; however, this is not true. Only a vehicle made in Japan specifically to be sold in Japan is considered JDM.

The average age of JDM cars is 8.7 years, ranking 9th in a survey of 30 of the top 50 countries by gross domestic product. According to the Fédération Internationale de l'Automobile, a car in Japan travels a yearly average of over only 9,300 kilometers (5,800 miles), less than half the U.S. average of 19,200 kilometers (12,000 miles).

Japanese domestic market vehicles may differ greatly from the cars that Japanese manufacturers build for export and vehicles derived from the same platforms built in other countries.  The Japanese car owner looks more toward innovation than long-term ownership which forces Japanese carmakers to refine new technologies and designs first in domestic vehicles. For instance, the 2003 Honda Inspire featured the first application of Honda's Variable Cylinder Management. However, the 2003 Honda Accord V6, which was the same basic vehicle, primarily intended for the North American market, did not feature VCM, which had a poor reputation after Cadillac's attempt in the 1980s with the V8-6-4 engine. VCM was successfully introduced to the Accord V6 in its redesign for 2008.

The horsepower limit was lifted in 2004 but the speed limit of  remains.

Motorcycle power and speed restrictions

For many years Japan had severe restrictions on the maximum power and speed that motorcycles could have.

Power restrictions were as follows

Pre-1993
250cc class: 45 hp
400cc class: 60 hp
750cc class: 77 hp
over 750cc: not allowed

Post-1993
250cc class: 40 hp
400cc class: 53 hp
750cc class: 77 hp
over 750cc: allowed, but restricted to 100 hp

VIN
Japanese carmakers do not use a vehicle identification number as is common overseas. Instead, they use either a Frame Number, Chassis Number, or Vehicle ID Number and also a Model Code as well as an Emissions Code  to identify their vehicles. The Frame Number identifies the vehicles model and serial number. For example, Frame Number SV30-0169266 breaks down as "SV30" identifying the model as Toyota Camry/Vista and "0169266" being the serial number of the vehicle.  The Model Code designates the vehicle's model number and features. As an example, ST205-BLMVZ breaks down as "ST205", which means it is a third generation Toyota Celica GT-FOUR, and "BLMVZ" which designates a set of features incorporated in the vehicle. The Emissions Code refers to the vehicle's designated emission standard at the time, usually being placed before the vehicle's model number, and with the five most commonly used designations being E, GF, GH, ABA, and CBA. These codes are only seen on JDM models and are not present on exported models of the same type. Examples would include E-EK9 or GF-EK9 from the first generation Civic Type R, E-BNR32 from the R32 Skyline GT-R, E-JZX100 from the eight generation Mark II. Another useful example to help differentiate between pure JDM models and export examples is the code JHMEEG6 on the European Civic VTi models and E-EG6 on the Japanese fifth generation Civic SiR trims. Correct identification of the chassis code using these markers would help prove the authenticity of the model.

Worldwide popularity

Motorcycles
In the '90s the JDM power restrictions along with license restrictions that made it difficult to be licensed on larger motorcycles resulted in a number of models that were not offered anywhere else in the world, with 250cc and 400cc miniature replicas of the bigger 750cc & 900cc bikes.

At the same time, Japan had particularly tough laws regarding road licensing and sales regulations. Any motorcycle more powerful than 250cc had to take an extensively stringent test every two years.

Combining these factors with a virtually non-existent second-hand market made it economic to export the nearly new bikes abroad where they were eagerly bought and a number of import specialists sprung up to cater for this "grey import" market of relatively inexpensive but interesting motorcycles.

In the later '90s as Japan's economy fell into recession it became less profitable to export and Japanese owners held on to their bikes for longer. The last global crash all but ended the "grey import" industry with the big specialist importers closing down.

Cars
Cars manufactured for the Japanese domestic market have been growing in popularity since the late 1990s. Many car enthusiasts are attracted to JDM cars in different continents such as North America, Europe, Asia and Africa. Popular brands include Honda, Subaru, Toyota, Mazda, Suzuki, Lexus, Mitsubishi Motors and Nissan.

Ex-Japan Imports are also very common in New Zealand where 59% of vehicles registered on New Zealand roads originated from overseas markets as opposed to 41% of which were delivered NZ-New. Of this, 94% originate from Japan.
New Zealand imported an average of 134,834 JDM vehicles per year in the period 2015–2019, the majority of which were Mazda 3 (Axela), Suzuki Swift, Nissan Tiida, Toyota Corolla and Mazda 2 (Demio). Other models popular for importation in previous years include exotic vehicles (Honda Torneo, Nissan Skyline, Nissan Laurel and Toyota Altezza), and kei cars (Suzuki Carry, Daihatsu Move, Subaru R2).  Due to the popularity of used imports from Japan, and their relatively poor crash-test ratings, the New Zealand Ministry of Transport is currently investigating tougher restrictions on imported vehicles, most notably on the importation of the Toyota Corolla, Mazda 2 (Demio) and Suzuki Swift.

In 2004, importing JDM cars became popular in Canada as highly sought after vehicles, such as the 1989 Nissan Skyline GT-R, became eligible to import under Canada's 15-year rule. In contrast, importing grey market vehicles into the United States is much more difficult. To avoid regulatory problems, most private individuals wait until EPA restrictions no longer apply to the desired vehicle, which is done on a rolling 25-year cycle.

Car Engines and other related car parts from Japan is also too common in developing countries such as Thailand and the Philippines. In Thailand, most of the used car engines being shipped overseas is kei car engines like Daihatsu ranging from 360cc and up to 660cc which became a top supplier among makers to build a Tuk-Tuk to be used in their public transport in Bangkok. While in the Philippines, used car engines being shipped and supplied by local automakers are mostly Toyota engines from old Toyota Corolla in the 1990s where the makers of Owner-type Jeep and some small-sized AUVs became a hit for local consumers which became a cheaper alternative than buying of brand-new cars at that time. Production of owner-type jeep and local AUVs in the Philippines were mostly being closed due to the importation of used cars from Japan by 2000s until it was also being banned in 2014, but even though the ban of importation of used cars of Japan is already existed, no one went interested to open up another production of owner-type jeeps since they also opened up more automakers from China to distribute to the local market just rightafter of importation ban, but since local consumers are still much more interested on used car imports from Japan, most of them are much more decided to buy a used kei-vans which became more popular among private car owners such as Suzuki Wagon R and Suzuki Carry in wagon variant also powered by 660cc gasoline engines, these importers also brought car parts being dismantled before shipping for them to rebuilt and to reassemble a particular unit to avoid extra cost on importation and shipping.

Railways
Ex-Japan import rolling stocks in all kinds is no exception on this list, although it can be considered as JDM but in special case since this was also intended for Japanese market which were mostly acquired by leading private railway companies across Japan such as Japan Railways, even subways such as Tokyo Metro, Tokyu Corporation, Toei Subway and so forth which was in demand for modernizing railway system in most developing countries such as Indonesia, Thailand, and Myanmar to acquire used trains from Japan rather than procuring brand-new rolling stocks, there are some cases that the management from each respective railway companies in Japan such as Japan Railways are decided to donate them to the oversea country, instead of scrapping them ahead in no time, which is really needed for a major upgrade and sign their agreement that the recipient of the oversea country will pay for its freight expenses and the rest will be free.
Here are different categories of used rolling stocks listed which were mostly shipped and operated overseas in different countries.

Electric Multiple Unit

Diesel Multiple Unit

Passenger Cars
Locomotives

Retail Shops
Outside of Japan, there are various shops which they sell various kinds of used items from Japan. Philippines is one of the known countries outside Japan to set up a retail outlet called, "Japan Surplus Shop" which is found in most towns of the country. They used to sell used appliances, furnitures, gadgets, accessories, and even bicycles designed for women, are still much more preferred by local buyers because of being more affordable than buying those newly locally made home furnitures, or even new gadgets which is becoming more dominating mostly coming from China and so forth. Most of these items depending on the condition.

Commercial vehicles

Buses 
In the early 1990s, Ex-Japanese buses had been rising popular and been common in the developing cities across Asia such as Manila, Philippines, Jakarta, Indonesia & even Yangon, Myanmar.

Like in the Philippines, direct importers near ports in Subic, Zambales & Cagayan Valley have started their auction business to import quality vehicles preferably from Japan. And then so, most of the clients who are mostly operating bus companies based in Manila, Philippines began their interest to grow their transport business thru buying Japan surplus buses from all cities in Japan which are definitely cheaper than buying brand-new ones which are mostly imported from other countries and some are locally assembled coach bodies but still at an expensive price.

Used buses like in the Philippines also requires to convert from RHD to LHD conversion which is in compliance with the Philippine traffic law called Republic Act No. 8506 entitled "An act banning the registration and operation of vehicles with right-hand steering wheel in any private or public street, road or highway, providing penalties therefor and for other purposes." A violation of this law is punished by imprisonment for a period from two years, four months, and one day, up to four years and two months, plus a fine of 50,000 pesos (approx. $1,000). And most of the used buses from Japan in Manila, Philippines are mostly operating within the city and intercity travel which are at least 10 years of age after being phased out in Japan.

Trucks 
As early also in the 1990s, there is no exception that there will be a Japanese domestic market trucks to be called as "Japan Surplus Trucks" for auction & export to any of the developing cities in Asia and even including Russia. Most of the Japanese domestic market trucks that have been exported are Isuzu, Mitsubishi Fuso, Hino and some are Nissan Diesel. These trucks are also proven much reliable and durable since domestic trucks in Japan has no exception for the 10 to 15 year phased out due to the compliance of Japan's existing traffic & environmental regulations and also to avoid any taxes once any domestic truck unit surpassed the age limit to be phasing out.

Japanese domestic market trucks, or 'surplus trucks' after being phased-out in Japan, are extremely popular in the Philippines such as Isuzu Elf, Isuzu Forward, Isuzu Giga, Mitsubishi Canter, Mitsubishi Fuso Super Great & Hino Profia since they are popularly cheaper than buying a brand-new Japanese trucks which are locally distributed and even brand-new trucks from China which is about thrice as expensive as an ordinary used Japanese domestic truck units. Auctioneers in the Philippines also started importing trucks in the 1990s and it had been a staple for every small to medium business enterprise owner particularly in the logistics industry to support and to grow their respective businesses as well aside from being cheap than buying new ones, but also really proven that they are built to last.

Another category for Japanese trucks are the smallest ones, or to be called as kei truck, they are also extremely popular in the Philippines once again to be called as "multicab" which are often reconditioned & converted to any public transportation vehicle like jeepney since they are lighter, more economical, more environmentally friendly than the conventional Philippine jeepneys which are mostly powered by used diesel engines from Japan.

Truck engines from Japan were also became a boom hit among small workshops and mostly being supplied by local manufacturers in the Philippines which they made Philippine Jeepneys since 1980s. Popular truck engines being supplied are Isuzu & Mitsubishi Fuso Canter, sometimes, depending from the local clients, they often requested to supply diesel engines from Mazda and Nissan to install them not just for jeepneys, but also called as AUV which is being used for daily commercial use or can be for private use who often they don't have enough budget than buying a brand-new AUVs offered in the Philippine market during those times such as Toyota Kijang, Mitsubishi Adventure, Mitsubishi L300 van or even Isuzu Crosswind

JDM-related components

Speed chime 

JDM specification model of vehicles oftentimes includes speed chime, that would ring if user has exceeded 105 km/h for standard cars, and 85 km/h for kei cars. This speed chime first mandated around on November 21, 1974, according to Article 1 of the "Ministerial Ordinance for Partial Revision of Safety Standards for Road Transport Vehicles", but soon abolished around 1986 with "Ministerial Ordinance for Partial Revision of Safety Standards for Road Transport Vehicles" (Ministry of Transport Ordinance No. 3 of 1986) due to non-tariff barrier pressured by US, and danger of drowsiness. Some model uses electromechanical system just like glockenspiel, but other model uses buzzer. Due to that, nickname for speed chime is kinkon.

Several vehicle after that time until early 2000s still offer speed chime as an option. The last vehicle to came with speed chime from factory is Honda City GA1/GA2.

Initial D anime features this speed chime prominently on Takumi Fujiwara's AE86.

Speed indicator light 

JDM specification model of trucks (over 5 ton loading capacity, 8 ton gross vehicle weight) was mandated to have speed indicator installed from August 1967, according to Article 48 of the Ministerial Ordinance "Safety Standards for Road Vehicles" based on the provisions of Chapter 3 of the Road Vehicle Law.

The speed indicator light is only mandated for large trucks and is not necessary for small and medium-sized trucks and large buses, but installation on these vehicles are not prohibited. Speed indicator is installed in front of the cab, or up in the roof.

Article 48 of the Ministerial Ordinance "Safety Standards for Road Vehicles" based on the provisions of Chapter 3 of the Road Vehicle Law for speed indicator light is as following (modified and also translated):

 The speed indicator device shall be of a structure that automatically turns on the following number of lights (thereinafter referred to as "speed indicator lights") when traveling at the speeds listed in the table below.
 40 km/h or less (*): 1 light
 Over 40 km/h up to 60km/h: 2 lights
 Over 60 km/h: 3 lights
 The speed indicator lamp shall not be equipped with a manual switch or the like that can easily turn off the speed indicator lamp, except for the power switch of the vehicle.
 The number of speed indicator lights that are on must be visible from a distance of 100m ahead.
 The light color of the speed indicator lamp shall be yellow-green.
 The display of the speed indicator lamp must be free of significant error when driving on flat paved roads.
 The speed display device shall be equipped with a light or other device that enables the driver to confirm its operating state from the driver's seat (usually they are located on speedometer).

Patterns for speed indicator is as following:

Abolishment and decline 
Since it was enacted in 1967, this obligatory speed indicator light become non-tariff barriers, especially for European and American manufacturers. Because this law applies only to Japan, when importing heavy-duty trucks made outside Japan, it has to be modified in order to install the speed indicator light so the truck would pass certifications. Also, this was a system that was introduced to visually and intuitively (albeit roughly) easily distinguish the speed of the vehicle, but many people didn't even know what those speed indicator lights meant for.

As the result, this device was eventually abolished in 2001.  Truck manufacturers have to install speed limiters instead which activates around 90 km/h.

JDM-inspired vehicles

Some car enthusiasts like to build replicas of JDM vehicles from locally available cars. For example, enthusiasts in the USA will often take a US-market Honda Civic (sixth generation), convert it from left-hand-drive to right-hand-drive and source the required parts such as the engine and gearbox from the JDM EK9 Type R - which is based on the same platform - in order to make an 'exact' copy. Other forms of "JDM Conversions" include converting a USDM model first generation Subaru Impreza and fitting JDM STi parts to make it seem as if it is a genuine WRX STi model. In Southeast Asia, it is common practice to convert a base model Mitsubishi Lancer and swap out the necessary parts, right down to the cutting of the floor pan, and create a Lancer Evolution copy.

However, cars such as this would not be authentic JDM cars as they would possess a United States vehicle identification number. It is also to be noted that, even with such modifications, it is impossible to recreate the running performance of the original car, as there are many engineering aspects which cannot be replicated by means of "conversion" alone. A good example would be body strengthening methods using spot welding and extra reinforcement on strut mounting points, stress areas in joints, etc. as found in the Lancer Evolution and EK9 Type R models. These reinforcements are not present on base model sixth generation hatchbacks and Mitsubishi Lancers. Hence, replicas or conversions would be similar from a visual standpoint only, as they lack the same level of structural rigidity as the original counterpart.

References

External links

Automotive industry in Japan
Retailing in Japan